Markus Knüfken (born 18 August 1965) is a German actor. He has appeared in more than eighty films since 1978.

Selected filmography

References

External links
 
 

1965 births
Living people
Actors from Essen
German male film actors
German male television actors
20th-century German male actors